Die Kinder (The Children) is a six-part British television political thriller miniseries, written by Paula Milne and directed by Rob Walker, that first broadcast on BBC2 on 14 November 1990. The series, which starred Miranda Richardson and Frederic Forrest, follows housewife Sidonie Reiger (Richardson) as she tries to rescue her children, who have been kidnapped by her ex-husband, a former radical activist. She enlists the help of private investigator Lomax (Forrest), as they find themselves caught between her husband's past associates and an international array of security service operatives.

The series co-starred Hans Kremer, Sam Cox and Derek Fowlds. The series aired in the United States as part of PBS' Mystery! strand of programming. The series has never been released on DVD. A novelisation of the screenplay by author Gavin Richards was published on 25 October 1990, three weeks prior to broadcast.

Cast
 Miranda Richardson as Sidonie Reiger
 Frederic Forrest as Lomax 
 Hans Kremer as Stefan Reiger 
 Sam Cox as Alan Mitchell
 Derek Fowlds as Crombie 
 Ulrich Pleitgen as Gunther Beck 
 Tommy Selby-Plewman as Michael Reiger
 Zara Warshal as Sabine Reiger 
 Hanns Zischler as Bellenberg
 Tina Engel as Karin Muller 
 Barrie Houghton as Gilmour 
 Beatrice Manowski as Eva Strachen

Episodes

References

External links
 

1990s British drama television series
1990 British television series debuts
BBC television dramas
1990s British television miniseries
1990 British television series endings
English-language television shows
British thriller television series